Lampronia morosa is a moth of the family Prodoxidae. It is found in most of Europe, except Ireland, Latvia, Lithuania, Portugal and  part of the Balkan Peninsula. It is also present in the Caucasus and Asia Minor.

The wingspan is 12–15 mm. The groundcolor of the forewings is dark fuscous, with whitish, indistinct spots. The hindwings are medium gray. Adults are on wing in May and June.

The larvae feed on Rosa species. After overwintering, larvae feed inside young rose shoots. Pupation takes place within the feeding gallery.

References

Moths described in 1852
Prodoxidae
Moths of Europe
Moths of Asia